Best Actress in a Supporting Role may refer to:

 AACTA Award for Best Actress in a Supporting Role
 BAFTA Award for Best Actress in a Supporting Role

See also List of awards for supporting actor#Female